Sufa or SUFA may refer to:

Sufa, Israel, a kibbutz in Israel and a border crossing between Israel and the Gaza Strip
Sufa, Sinai, a former Israeli settlement in Sinai
AIL Storm, also known as Sufa, an Israel Defense Forces vehicle
INS Sufa, an Israeli Sea Corps Saar 4.5 class missile boat
Social Union Framework Agreement, a Canadian labour agreement
F-16I, also known as Sufa, a two seat Block 52 variant of the F-16 Fighting Falcon, heavily modified by the Israeli Defense Forces.